The Defence Science and Technology Group (DSTG) is part of the Australian Department of Defence dedicated to providing science and technology support to safeguard Australia and its national interests. The agency's name was changed from Defence Science and Technology Organisation (DSTO) on 1 July 2015. It is Australia's second largest government-funded science organisation after the CSIRO and its research outcomes have enhanced Defence capability and supported operations for over 100 years.

The Chief Defence Scientist leads DSTG. The position is supported by an independent Advisory Board with representatives from defence, industry, academia and the science community. DSTG has an annual budget of approximately $440 million and employs over 2500 staff, predominantly scientists, engineers, IT specialists and technicians.

DSTG has establishments in all Australian states and the Australian Capital Territory with representatives in Washington, London and Tokyo. It collaborates with science and technology organisations around the world to strengthen its technology base and works with Australian industry and universities to enhance defence capability. DSTG is a member of The Technical Cooperation Program (TTCP) with the United States, United Kingdom, Canada and New Zealand. It also has bilateral defence science agreements with USA, UK, France, Sweden, Netherlands, Norway and Singapore. In February 2012, DSTG was given the whole-of-government responsibility to co-ordinate research and development for Australia's national security.

History
DSTG has a history of delivering innovative science to support the Australian Defence Force. The Defence Science and Technology Organisation (DSTO), was created in 1974 by amalgamating the Australian Defence Scientific Service with the Science Branch of the Department of Defence. Over the next 20 years various other Australian Defence laboratories were integrated with DSTO, including what remained of the Weapons Research Establishment, responsible for the Woomera test range.

 1907 – Defence science begins in Australia.
 1910 – The start of explosives research at a guardhouse (called the Chemical Adviser's Laboratory) at Victoria Barracks, Melbourne.
 1911 – Defence Explosive Factory Maribyrnong established at Maribyrnong.
 1912 – Small Arms Factory established at Lithgow.
 1921 – Munitions Supply Board created within Department of Defence.
 1922 – Chemical Adviser's Laboratory became the Munitions Supply Laboratories (MSL) of the Munitions Supply Board.
 1929 – Proof Range established at Port Wakefield.
 1939 – Aeronautical & Engine Research Test Laboratory established at Fishermans Bend as part of the Council for Scientific and Industrial Research (CSIR) Division of Aeronautics.
 1940 – Department of Munitions established. Salisbury Explosives Factory and Finsbury Munitions Factory built within rural environs of Adelaide.
 1946 – Munitions Supply Laboratories (MSL) established at Finsbury, South Australia (later known as Woodville North when the suburb name was changed) as a branch of MSL at Maribyrnong.
 1946 – Anglo-Australian Joint Project established at Woomera, with aviation support at RAAF Base Mallala.
 1947 – Long Range Weapons Establishment (LRWE) formed in Salisbury, South Australia to support the guided weapons facility at Woomera.
 1948 – Munitions Supply Laboratories changes its name to Defence Research Laboratories.
 1949 – Fishermans Bend laboratory transferred from CSIR (Council for Scientific and Industrial Research) to the Department of Supply & Development; renamed Aeronautical Research Laboratories (ARL). Australian Defence Scientific Service established, incorporating LRWE and the Defence Research Laboratories.
 1949 – Laboratory established in Alexandria, NSW as part of Defence Research Laboratories to undertake research in physical metallurgy and metallurgical chemistry areas.
 1949 – Three new laboratories formed in Salisbury – High Speed Aerodynamics Laboratory, Propulsion Research Laboratory and the Electronics Research Laboratory, collectively known as the Chemistry & Physics Research Laboratory.
 1953 – Defence Research Laboratories changes its name to Defence Standards Laboratories.
 1955 – LRWE and all the Salisbury laboratories amalgamated to form the Weapons Research Establishment (WRE). RAAF Base Edinburgh established near Salisbury, superseding Mallala.
 1956 – The Royal Australian Navy (RAN) Experimental Laboratory established.

 1957 – Black Box flight recorder invented by Dr David Warren – originally named the ARL Flight Memory Unit. Its descendants are now installed in large airline aircraft and most military aircraft.   
 1958 – The Army Food Research Laboratories were formally established at Scottsdale, Tasmania under the Quartermaster General Branch, Army Headquarters. The Laboratories' role included research and development of foods for the three Services. Laboratories renamed Defence Food Research Establishment-Vegetable Dehydration Division in 1958.
 1960 – The Defence Food Research Establishment-Vegetable Dehydration Division renamed The Army Food Science Establishment.
 1961 – The Army Food Science Establishment renamed The Army Food Research Station.
 1962 – Joint Tropical Research Unit (JTRU) established in Innisfail, Queensland and operated jointly with the British Ministry of Defence.
 1967 – Built and launched WRESAT, Australia's first artificial satellite.
 1969 – RAN Experimental Laboratory changes name to RAN Research Laboratory (RANRL).
 1971 – The Army Food Science Establishment renamed the Armed Forces Food Science Establishment.
 1972 – ARL transferred to the Department of Manufacturing Industry.
 1974 – As a result of Defence restructuring, the Defence Science & Technology Organisation (DSTO) is created by integrating the Australian Defence Scientific Service, the in-house R&D units of the Armed Services and the Science Branch of the Department of Defence. Defence Standards Laboratories becomes the Materials Research Laboratories (MRL).
 1975 – Official transfer of all Defence R&D activities to DSTO in the Department of Defence. The Armed Forces Food Science Establishment (AFFSE) became part of the Service Laboratories and Trials (SLT) division of DSTO.
 1977 – Joint Tropical Trials and Research Establishment established (JTTRE), merging JTRU and Tropical Trials Establishment situated at Cowley Beach, Queensland.
 1977 – MRL, Woodville North transferred to CSIRO Division of Materials Science.
 1978 – WRE split into four smaller laboratories: Weapons Systems Research Laboratory (WSRL), Electronics Research Laboratory (ERL), Trials Research Laboratory (TRL) and Advanced Engineering Laboratory (AEL). The four laboratories were collectively known as the Defence Research Centre Salisbury (DRCS).
 1982 – The Armed Forces Food Science Establishment became a part of Materials Research Laboratories (MRL).
 1984 – RAN Research Laboratory transferred to WSRL.
 1985 – Materials Research Laboratories, Alexandria, NSW transferred to Army.
 1987 – Five year restructuring of DSTO laboratories begins. New Surveillance Research Laboratory created and WRE's Electronics Research Laboratory reorganised. RANRL transferred to MRL and renamed. 
 1989 – Control of Cowley Beach was returned to the Army and Innisfail became MRL, Qld.
 1992 – The UK-Australia Tropical Research agreement terminated.
 1991 – WSRL abolished to leave four laboratories in DSTO.
 1994 – ARL and MRL merge to form the Aeronautical & Maritime Research Laboratory (AMRL) headquartered in Fishermans Bend. Surveillance Research Laboratory and Electronics Research Laboratory merge to form the Electronics & Surveillance Research Laboratory (ESRL) headquartered in Salisbury, leaving only two laboratories in DSTO.
 1994 – The Armed Forces Food Science Establishment was renamed The Defence Food Science Centre (DFSC).
 1997 – ESRL complex rationalised and new "Knowledge Systems Building" in Edinburgh, South Australia, (the newly renamed part of Salisbury containing DSTO), officially opened. The Defence Food Science Centre (DFSC) was renamed Defence Nutrition Research Centre (DNRC). Port Wakefield Proof Range became the Proof and Experimental Establishment.
 2002 – DSTO restructured, resulting in three laboratories: Platforms Sciences Laboratory, Systems Sciences Laboratory and Information Sciences Laboratory.
 2002 – DSTO, along with the Royal Australian Air Force and the Canadian Forces, wins the ICAS von Karman Award for International Cooperation in Aeronautics for its international program assessing the fatigue life of the F/A-18 A/B Hornet aircraft.
 2003 – Maritime Operational Analysis Centre (MOAC) opened at Garden Island, Sydney
 2004 – H A Wills Structures and Materials Test Centre officially opened at Fishermans Bend.
 2004 – CBRN functions transferred from Maribyrnong to Fishermans Bend.
 2004 – Torpedo Systems Centre and Maritime Experimentation Laboratory opened at DSTO Edinburgh
 2005 – Laboratory Directors renamed to DCDS (Deputy Chief Defence Scientist):
Director, Platforms Sciences Laboratory renamed DCDS (Platforms & Human Systems),
Director, Systems Sciences Laboratory renamed DCDS (Policy & Programs),
Director, Information Sciences Laboratory renamed DCDS (Information & Weapon Systems) and
First Assistant Secretary, Science Policy renamed Chief, Science Planning & Coordination Division.
Air Operations Division to report to DCDS (Platforms & Human Systems).
New stand-alone Information Integration Branch created in Edinburgh under DCDS (Information & Weapon Systems).
 2006 – DSTO and US Air Force sign agreement on Hypersonic International Flight Research Experimentation (HIFiRE) Program.
 2007 – DSTO Maribyrnong shut down in May with all personnel moved to a new facility within the existing DSTO Fishermans Bend site.
 2007 – DSTO establishes Brisbane laboratory to undertake hypersonics research. 
 2007 – DSTO celebrates 100 Years of Defence Science and Technology in Australia
 2007 – Personnel at DSTO Canberra Fern Hill Park moved to new facilities at Fairbairn.
 2008 – DSTO Pyrmont commenced move to Eveleigh.
 2008 – Professor Robert Clark appointed Chief Defence Scientist, the first external appointment to the post since 1991.
 2009 – DSTO and US Air Force complete first successful launch under the Hypersonic International Flight Research Experimentation (HIFiRE) Program, confirming that the test vehicle turned onto the correct heading and elevation for re-entry into the atmosphere as designed.
 2010 – DSTO organises the Multi Autonomous Ground-robotic International Challenge with US Army.
 2012 – DSTO, along with the US Air Force Research Laboratory, Boeing Research & Technology and the University of Queensland, wins the ICAS von Karman Award for International Cooperation in Aeronautics for collaboration on the Hypersonic International Flight Research Experimentation (HIFiRE) Program.
 2012 – Dr Alex Zelinsky appointed Chief Defence Scientist in March 2012.
 2015 – DSTO becomes DSTG.
2019 – Professor Tanya Monro appointed Chief Defence Scientist, first woman in this position.

Sites

DSTG has its headquarters at Fairbairn in Canberra with sites in each state of Australia:
South Australia: Edinburgh and Port Wakefield north of Adelaide.
Victoria: Fishermans Bend in Melbourne.
New South Wales: Eveleigh in Sydney.
Queensland: Pullenvale in Brisbane, and Innisfail in north Queensland.
Western Australia: HMAS Stirling at Rockingham, south of Perth
Tasmania: Scottsdale

It also has a presence in the Russell Offices in Canberra, in the Australian Capital Territory.

Previous sites have included:
Fern Hill Technology Park in Bruce, a suburb of Canberra
Pyrmont, on the shore of Sydney harbour
Maribyrnong in Melbourne

Chief Defence Scientist
The Chief Defence Scientist of Australia leads the Defence Science & Technology Group (DSTG Group). Prof. Tanya Monro is the current Chief Defence Scientist, having taken up the role in March 2019.

Organisational structure
The More, Together: Defence Science and Technology Strategy 2030  was launched in May 2020 and sets the directions for defence science and technology (S&T) out to 2030. It includes initiatives to focus resources on Defence's highest strategic priorities, and supports more streamlined transitioning of ideas into capability. The key objectives of the Strategy are to focus on larger S&T programs supporting Defence strategic priorities, increase scale by partnering with the national S&T enterprise and international partners, deliver impact and a capability edge through streamlined and secure innovation pathways.

The Strategy is underpinned by three strategic pillars and introduces the Science, Technology and Research (STaR) Shot concept. While the STaR Shots focus the national S&T enterprise on Defence objectives to deliver leap-ahead capabilities, the strategic pillars enable the STaR Shots and support the broader Defence S&T program.

Previously, the launch of DSTG's five-year Strategic Plan 2013–18  helped to streamline its organisational structure to better reflect Defence priorities and align with the 2013 Defence White Paper. The new structure came into effect from 1 July 2013 and provided three Corporate Divisions: Science Strategy and Program Division, Science Partnerships and Engagement Division and Research Services Division along with seven Research Divisions: Maritime Division, Land Division, Aerospace Division, Joint and Operations Analysis Division, National Security and Intelligence, Surveillance and Reconnaissance Division, Cyber and Electronic Warfare Division, and Weapons and Combat Systems Division.

Equipment

Aircraft 
 A53 Beech 1900C

See also 
 ANSTO (Australian Nuclear Science and Technology Organisation) – Australia's national nuclear organisation and the centre of Australian nuclear expertise
 CSIRO (Commonwealth Scientific and Industrial Research Organisation) – the national government body for scientific research in Australia
 NICTA (National ICT Australia) – Australia's national information and communication technology research centre
 South Australian Aviation Museum – repository of DSTG's historic rocket collection from the period 1950 – 1980.
 TTCP (The Technical Cooperation Program) – An international defence science and technology collaboration between Australia, Canada, New Zealand, the United Kingdom and the United States.

References

External links
 Official DSTG Website
About DSTG
DSTG Divisions
DST Group History and Historical Publications
Unclassified Scientific Publications (about 4,000)

Military of Australia
Australian Defence Force
Leadership of the Australian Defence Force
Scientific organisations based in Australia
Defence agencies of Australia
 
Defence science and technology agencies
Articles containing video clips